Faaborg-Midtfyn or Fåborg-Midtfyn is a municipality (Danish, kommune) in Region of Southern Denmark in Denmark. It covers an area of 638 km² and has a total population of 51,849 (2022).

On 1 January 2007 Faaborg-Midtfyn municipality was created as the result of Kommunalreformen ("The Municipal Reform" of 2007), consisting of the  former municipalities of Broby, Ringe, Aarslev, Ryslinge, and Faaborg.

Urban areas
The ten largest urban areas in the municipality are:

Politics
Faaborg-Midtfyn's municipal council consists of 25 members, elected every four years. The municipal council has six political committees.

Municipal council
Below are the municipal councils elected since the Municipal Reform of 2007.

References

External links 

  
 Municipal statistics: NetBorger Kommunefakta, delivered from KMD  Kommunedata (Municipal Data)
 Municipal mergers and neighbors: Eniro new municipalities map

 
Municipalities of the Region of Southern Denmark
Municipalities of Denmark
Populated places established in 2007